Bugyi is a village in Pest County, Hungary.
Bugyi is a village of 5,149 residents on 11,558 hectares (28,560 acres; 45 sq mi) and about 30 km (south from Budapest.  It is located at the intersection of roads connecting Ócsa to Kiskunlacháza and Taksony to Dabas and Kunpeszér, but it is not directly linked into major, state highways.

Etymology
The name of the town first appeared in official documents as Latin “Bevd” in 1321 of a form Budymatheusfelde (translation: Matthew Bugy land). It is named from the personal names starting with "Bud" (from the verb "to be") of the original Czech/Slavic settlers. Examples include: Budweis (to be wise), Budik (awaken), Budimir (peaceful). 
The -i suffix in Hungarian "Bugy-i" denotes "of Bud". 
The place name HAS etymological connection to the contemporary Hungarian common name "bugyi", meaning women's panties.

History
The township was fused from several medieval villages (Bugy, Vány, Ráda, Ürbo). The region's natural and economic development was defined by the Danube's ancient river bank, which was drained in the 1920s. As a result of its various soil types and micro climate, the region is especially well suited for agricultural production; hence, its important role in providing the capital with fresh produce. The town neighbors an area of gravel mines, so its geography is spackled with mining lakes.

One of Bugyi's significant treasures is its rich flora and fauna. The area's rich bird and game life attracts hunters and nature lovers from home and abroad. The township's southwestern fields ease into the Kiskunság National Park, which is known as one of Central-Europe's birding paradises with its saline lakes and wetlands. Some of its rare treasures are the Great Bustard or the 9.4-hectare protected ancient marshland's most beautiful flower Iris pumila.

Bugyi's historical landmarks are concentrated around its triangular Baroque main square. St. Adalbert Roman Catholic church, for example, was built in 1761 by Count Károly, I. Eszterházy, Bishop of Vác. The Beleznay Castle hosted important Hungarian cultural figures in the distant past. Next to the Lutheran church, which was built in 1783, there is the so-called “shame stone,” a monument probably from the time of the Avars. We can still find the marble head stones in the Jewish cemetery. At present, one of the town's most festive events is the harvest pageant every October.

Twin city 
  Arad - Romania

External links

  in Hungarian

Populated places in Pest County